Diaulota is a genus of rove beetles in the family Staphylinidae. There are about eight described species in Diaulota.

Species
These eight species belong to the genus Diaulota:
 Diaulota alaskana Ahn, 1996
 Diaulota aokii Sawada, 1971
 Diaulota densissima Casey, 1893
 Diaulota fulviventris Moore, 1956
 Diaulota harteri Moore, 1956
 Diaulota pacifica Sawada, 1971
 Diaulota uenoi (Sawada, 1955)
 Diaulota vandykei Moore, 1956

References

Further reading

 
 
 
 
 

Aleocharinae